Xiphopenaeus kroyeri, commonly called the Atlantic seabob, is a commercially important prawn.

Description
The rostrum has five teeth near the base, but is smooth along the tip, which is greatly elongated and often curves upwards to varying degrees.

Distribution and fishery
X. kroyeri lives in the western Atlantic Ocean from North Carolina to Santa Catarina state, Brazil. It is the most important commercial prawn in parts of the United States from Pensacola (in the Florida Panhandle) to Texas, and in the Guianas. In other areas, such as Mexico, Nicaragua, Honduras, and Trinidad, the fishing effort is only locally intensive.

Taxonomy
Xiphopenaeus kroyeri was first described by Camill Heller in 1862, under the name Penaeus kroyeri. It was transferred to the genus Xiphopenaeus in 1869 by Sidney Irving Smith. X. kroyeri has been considered conspecific with the Pacific species X. riveti, but recent genetic analysis indicates that the two are separate species, and that X. kroyeri (sensu stricto) may even constitute two cryptic species.

References

Penaeidae
Crustaceans of the Atlantic Ocean
Edible crustaceans
Commercial crustaceans
Crustaceans described in 1862